The Vista Alegre crater is a meteorite crater in Coronel Vivida, Paraná State, Brazil.  On the surface it appears as a circular, relatively flat plain within otherwise hilly terrain.

Description 
More recently, a date of about 115 Ma has been given and closer to the age of Vargeão Dome. Considering the proximity of location, age, and stratigraphic similarities of Vista Alegre and Vargeão, it has been proposed that it was a double impact.

See also 

 Vargeão Dome

References 

Impact craters of Brazil
Paleocene impact craters
Cretaceous impact craters
Cretaceous Brazil
Landforms of Paraná (state)
Craters